Eosopostega is a genus of moths of the family Opostegidae.

Species
Eosopostega armigera Puplesis & Robinson, 1999
Eosopostega issikii D.R. Davis, 1988

Etymology
The generic name originates from the Greek eos (dawn, east) prefixed to the generic stem Opostega, in reference to the extreme eastern palearctic distribution of this taxon. It is feminine in gender.

External links
Generic Revision of the Opostegidae, with a Synoptic Catalog of the World's Species (Lepidoptera: Nepticuloidea)

Opostegidae
Monotrysia genera